This article shows all participating team squads at the 2008 FIVB Women's World Olympic Qualification Tournament, held from May 17 to May 25, 2008.

Head coach: Beato Miguel Cruz

Head coach: Shoichi Yanagimoto

Head coach: Viktor Zhuravlev

Head coach: Marco Bonitta

Head coach: Juan Carlos Núñez

Head coach: Zoran Terzic

Head coach: Lee Jung-Chul

Head coach: Nataphon Srisamutnak

References
FIVB

S
Q
Q
S
Vol